John Aitken (1870 – unknown) was a Scottish footballer who played as a forward. Born in Dumfries, he played for Kings Rifle Volunteers and Manchester United.

External links
MUFCInfo.com profile

1870 births
Scottish footballers
Manchester United F.C. players
Year of death missing
Footballers from Dumfries
Association football forwards